The Chambers Brothers are an American psychedelic soul band, best known for their eleven-minute 1967 psychedelic soul hit "Time Has Come Today". The group was part of the wave of new music that integrated American blues and gospel traditions with modern psychedelic and rock elements. Their music has been kept alive through frequent use in film soundtracks.

Early career
Originally from Carthage, Mississippi, the Chambers Brothers first honed their skills as members of the choir in their Baptist church. This arrangement ended in 1952 when the eldest brother, George, was drafted into the Army. George relocated to Los Angeles after his discharge, and his brothers soon joined him. Beginning in 1954, the foursome played gospel and folk music throughout the Southern California region, but remained little known until 1965 when they began performing in New York City.

Consisting of George (September 26, 1931 – October 12, 2019) on washtub bass (later on bass guitar Danelectro and Gibson Thunderbird), Lester (b. April 13, 1940) on harmonica, and Willie (b. March 3, 1938) and Joe (b. August 22, 1942) on guitar, the group started to venture outside the gospel circuit, playing at coffeehouses that booked folk acts. They played at places like The Ash Grove, a very popular Los Angeles folk club. It became one of their favorite haunts and brought them into contact with Hoyt Axton, Ramblin' Jack Elliott, Reverend Gary Davis, and Barbara Dane. When Dane spotted the brothers there, she knew they would be perfect to do these freedom songs that people wanted to hear then. Dane became a great supporter, performing and recording with the brothers. With the addition of Brian Keenan (January 28, 1943 – October 5, 1985) on drums, Dane took them on tour with her and introduced them to Pete Seeger, who helped put the Chambers Brothers on the bill of the 1965 Newport Folk Festival. One of the songs they performed, "I Got It", appeared on the Newport Folk Festival 1965 compilation LP, which was issued on the Vanguard label.

They were becoming more accepted in the folk community, but, like many on the folk circuit, were looking to electrify their music and develop more of a rock and roll sound. Joe Chambers recalled in a May 1994 Goldmine article that people at the Newport Folk Festival were breaking down fences and rushing to the stage. "Newport had never seen or heard anything like that." After the group finished and the crowd finally settled down, the MC came up and said "Whether you know it or not, that was rock 'n' roll." That night they played at a post-concert party for festival performers and went to a recording session of the newly electrified Bob Dylan. Shortly after appearing at Newport, the group released its debut album, People Get Ready.

The group recorded "All Strung Out Over You" which was composed by Rudy Clark. It was released on Columbia 4-43957 on December 19, 1966.
It was rushed out by Columbia after the label had rejected an early version of "Time Has Come Today". "All Strung Out Over You" became a regional hit for the group which gave them the opportunity to re-record "The Time Has Come Today".

"Time Has Come Today"
The band scored its only major hit in the fall of 1968 with "Time Has Come Today", an 11-minute opus written by Joe and Willie Chambers and highlighted by echoing vocal effects and Keenan's drumming which gave the song a psychedelic feel. "Time Has Come Today" was edited for release as a single and spent five consecutive weeks in September–October at #11 on the Billboard Hot 100, just missing the Top Ten.

Later years
Later incarnations of the group included session guitarist Steve Hunter (known for his work with Alice Cooper) An album recorded in 1972 for  Columbia, Oh! My God, has remained unreleased until October 28, 2022 when it was finally made available through multiple digital platforms.  Although the group disbanded in 1972, they reformed and moved from Columbia to Avco Records and released Unbonded (1974) and Right Move (1975). In 1976 the brothers released Recorded Live In Concert on Mars for the Roxbury label. They have toured irregularly since.

They were signed to support Maria Muldaur on her Gospel Nights album. They also made commercials for Levi's Jeans.

Lester moved to New York and formed a band with former Electric Flag bassist Harvey Brooks. Guitarists Willie and Joe would find work as session men; George went back to singing gospel music and would later become a deacon of his church. Keenan retired to Stamford, Connecticut where he set up his own recording studio, and died of heart failure in 1985 

American Session Drummer, Lee Szymborski, also from Stamford Connecticut, was hired by George Chambers to replace Brian Keenan in 1980, in Los Angeles, CA., and performed live with The Chambers Brothers at the Hollywood Bowl's Fourth Annual Survival Sunday Anti-Nuclear Benefit Concert, with Bruce Springsteen, Jackson Browne, Stephen Stills, Bonnie Rait, Graham Nash, Gary U.S. Bonds, Peter Yarrow, Kenny Rankin and others in Los Angeles, CA. on June 14, 1981. Lee Szymborski also performed live with The Chambers Brothers and Etta James for two shows at McCabe's Guitar Shop 3101 Pico Blvd. Santa Monica, CA. July 16, 1981.

Art Ramsey was hired as a replacement drummer. He performed live, on-the-road and in many different cities and venues with the Chambers Brothers band after Lee Szymborski's departure. Later, L.A. session drummer Fabian Jolivet joined the band for a 1997 tour that ended with the full line up returning to the Ash Grove and playing a gospel set.

In 2006, guitarist Willie Chambers sat in with a group called Vince and the Invinceables at a benefit concert for Arthur Lee of the group Love and delivered an acclaimed performance.

In 2015, Joe Chambers was appearing at venues such as Harold's Place on Pacific Ave. San Pedro as The Joe Chambers Experience.

In 2016, Willie, Joe, and occasionally George, along with their nephew Jerry Warner on bass, Crazy Tomes on guitar, and LA drummer Jon McCracken, reformed as the Chambers Brothers to do shows in the Los Angeles area; including the Grammy Museum in Los Angeles, CA.

George Chambers died October 12, 2019, at age 88.

Joe Chambers collaborated with Marva Holiday, recording their version of "To Love Somebody".

Summer of Soul
In 2021 the Chambers Brothers appeared in the Questlove music documentary "Summer of Soul," about the 1969 Harlem Cultural Festival.

Members
In 1970, there was some confusion as to if The Chambers Brothers were still with their label, Columbia. The source was an article in the March 28, 1970 issue of Record World. Apparently, singer Judd Hamilton was at a party for an American International Records signing and there was confusion about the Chambers Brothers signing to the label or, and Hamilton being a member of the group. The next issue of Record World, (April 4) clarified that The Chambers Brothers were not with the American International label and were still with Columbia Records. It also stated that Hamilton was not a member of The Chambers Brothers. 

There was another error, this time by Cash Box in the April 18 issue. Cliff Chambers who had his own label Cyclone Records and composed “Finders Keepers” and “Somebody Ought to Write a Book” was credited with being a member of The Chambers Brothers while he was signing a contract with Kent Records. The error was picked up and Cash Box wrote in the May 9 issue (Cliff Chambers Not Ex-Chambers) that the group's manager, Charles H. LaMarr said that Cliff Chambers was never a member of the group and that the Chambers' included Joseph Chambers, George Chambers, Willie Chambers and Brian Keenan.

John Castellano joined the band as a guitarist, touring with them during 1971 and 1972. This came about as a result of the brothers finding out that Castellano's mother made the clothes that Jimi Hendrix wore. They headed out to Bath Avenue, in Brooklyn to have the clothes fitted and heard Castellano playing on guitar. Eventually Castellano came on board.

Charted singles 

Billboard albums listing
 1967  The Time Has Come, Black Albums, #6; Pop Albums, #4
 1968   A New Time-A New Day, Black Albums, peaked at #24
 1968   A New Time-A New Day, Pop Albums, #16
 1970  Love, Peace and Happiness, Black Albums, #17; Pop Albums #58
 1970   The Chambers Brothers Greatest Hits (Vault), Pop Albums #193
 1971   New Generation, Black Albums #36; Pop Albums #145
 1972  The Chambers Brothers' Greatest Hits (Columbia), Pop Albums, #166
 1974   Unbonded, Pop Albums, #144

Discography

Studio albums
 The Time Has Come (1967)
 A New Time – A New Day (1968)
 Feelin' the Blues (7/1969)
 New Generation (1971)
 Unbonded (1974)
 Right Move (1975)

Live albums
 People Get Ready (1966)
 Now! (1967)
 Shout (1968)
 Love, Peace And Happiness/Live At Bill Graham's Fillmore East (1969)
 Live in Concert on Mars (1976)
 Live Fillmore West 65 (2004)
 Live (2005)

Unreleased album
 Oh, My God! (1972)
Finally released on multiple digital platforms on October 28, 2022.

Compilations
 Groovin' Time (1968)
 Chambers Brothers' Greatest Hits [Double Album] (1970)
 Greatest Hits (1971)
 The Best of the Chambers Brothers [Double Album] (1973)
 The Time Has Come / A New Time – A New Day [2 on 1 Album] (1975)
 Greatest Hits (1988)
 Goin Uptown (1995)
 Time Has Come: Best Of The Chambers Brothers (1996)
 Time (1998)
 Now/People Get Ready [2 on 1 CD] (1999)

Collaborations
 Barbara Dane and The Chambers Brothers (1966)
 Mike Bloomfield: From His Head To His Heart To His Hands (incl. Tombstone Blues - Alternate Chambers Brothers Version, with Bob Dylan)
 The Four Sides of Buzzy Linhart - Buzzy Linhart (1982, EP)

References

External links
Classic Bands Profile
 
 
Willie Chambers Interview NAMM Oral History Library (2020)
Joe Chambers Interview NAMM Oral History Library (2020)
Lester Chambers Interview NAMM Oral History Library (2016)

Reviews
 The Time Has Come Today, review by Paul Hollingsworth
 Your Top 20 Favorite Psychedelic Songs of All-Time
 The Chambers Brothers Shout!
 Chambers Brothers' Time Has Come Today Once Again

American soul musical groups
Columbia Records artists
Musical groups from Los Angeles
Musical groups established in 1954
Musical groups disestablished in 1972
Musical groups reestablished in 1974
Psychedelic rock music groups from California
Sibling musical groups
Musical groups from Mississippi